Masako Sato may refer to:

, Japanese field hockey player
, Japanese ice hockey player